Cape Cod Academy (CCA) is an independent coed college preparatory school for grades Kindergarten through 12 located in Osterville, Massachusetts.

Mission statement

"The pursuit of academic excellence and development of life skills in a safe, values-centered community."

Statistics

The Academy was incorporated in 1976 and functions on a school preparatory curriculum. The school is a member of several associations: the National Association of Independent Schools (NAIS), Association of Independent Schools of New England (AISNE), and additionally has been accredited by the New England Association of Schools and Colleges (NEASC). Almost all graduates from the Academy are accepted in college, and many are accepted into very competitive colleges, including Ivy League matriculations.

Tuition fees

Tuition fee approximations based on schedule of fees for academic year 2017-2018.

Kindergarten-Grade 5 tuition and fees: $25,100
Grades 6-8 tuition and fees: $28,550
Grades 9-12 tuition and fees: $29,800

Academics

Lower school
The lower school (grades K-5) is located in a separate wing of the school containing its own classrooms, library, indoor gymnasium, and science classroom.  Lower school classrooms are self-contained with their own bathrooms, sinks, refrigerators, and cubby spaces.  In addition the lower school has its own separate outdoor playground and playing fields. All students in the lower school begin taking Spanish in Kindergarten and continue through Grade 8.

Middle school

Middle school consists of grades 6 through 8. Students begin having individual schedules, moving independently between English, History, Math, Science, and Languages.

Upper school
In grades 9-12, students choose between regular, honors, and Advanced Placement level courses, and may choose to study French or Spanish. Seminars are available for the middle and upper school curriculum. Seminars run each trimester; options have included equine science, fashion design, beginning German, computer programming, project adventure, jewelry making, plen-air painting, and many others.

Arts

Students in K through 12 can choose to participate in artistic endeavors such as plays, musicals, instrumental music, chorus, painting, drawing, ceramics, and sculpture.

Athletics

Cape Cod Academy has three outdoor lacrosse and soccer fields, an outdoor baseball field, two indoor basketball courts, an indoor weight room, an outdoor swimming pool and 8 tennis courts.

Fall
Boys Cross Country Running
Girls Cross Country Running
Coed Golf
Boys JV and Varsity Soccer
Girls JV and Varsity Soccer

Winter
Boys JV and Varsity Basketball
Girls JV and Varsity Basketball
Boys Hockey
Coed Winter Conditioning

Spring
Boys JV and Varsity Lacrosse
Girls JV and Varsity Lacrosse
Boys Varsity Baseball
Boys JV and Varsity Tennis
Girls JV and Varsity Tennis
Coed Sailing

Summer camps

Cape Cod Academy opened its first day camp during the summer of 2013. Seahawk Camp is offered for 7 weeks from June through August. It is open to CCA students and non-CCA students. Cape Cod Academy's campus also hosts several other camps throughout the summer.

References

External links
Cape Cod Academy

1976 establishments in Massachusetts
Buildings and structures in Barnstable, Massachusetts
Educational institutions established in 1976
Private elementary schools in Massachusetts
Private middle schools in Massachusetts
Private high schools in Massachusetts
Private preparatory schools in Massachusetts
Schools in Barnstable County, Massachusetts